František Čermák and Pavel Vízner were the defending champions, but lost in the semifinals to Stéphane Bohli and Stanislas Wawrinka.

Jaroslav Levinský and Filip Polášek won in the final 3–6, 6–2, [11–9], against Stéphane Bohli and Stanislas Wawrinka.

Seeds

Draw

Draw

External links
 Draw

Doubles